The Withypool Bridge is an arch bridge that carries a small road over the River Barle at Withypool in Somerset, England. It is a Grade II* listed building.

The red sandstone bridge was built in the 19th century.

The bridge was restored in 1866 and again in 1983.

References

Bridges in Somerset
Exmoor
Grade II* listed buildings in West Somerset
Scheduled monuments in West Somerset
Grade II* listed bridges in England
Stone bridges in the United Kingdom
Arch bridges in the United Kingdom